John Raphael Quinn (March 28, 1929 – June 22, 2017) was an American prelate of the Roman Catholic Church. He was Archbishop of San Francisco from 1977 to 1995 and Archbishop of Oklahoma City (and Bishop of the predecessor 
Diocese) from 1971 to 1977. He served as the president of the United States Conference of Catholic Bishops from 1977 to 1980.

Early life and ordination
Quinn was born in Riverside, California, and ordained to the priesthood for the Diocese of San Diego on July 19, 1953. Pope Paul VI named him auxiliary bishop of San Diego with the titular see of Thisiduo on October 21, 1967. He was consecrated on December 12. While a social progressive, Quinn was identified with a conservative camp in the questions of dogma. Early in his career as an auxiliary bishop, he criticized American "pansexuality and materialism" in a 1971 interview, noting that as a result, the supernatural explanation of celibacy falls on deaf ears in many parts of Western society.

Archbishop of Oklahoma City
On November 17, 1971, he was appointed Bishop of Oklahoma City-Tulsa. When the diocese was split to form the Archdiocese of Oklahoma City and the Diocese of Tulsa on December 13, 1972, Quinn became the first Archbishop of Oklahoma City.

The website of that Archdiocese reports that "he revealed his priorities by his actions: emphasis on priestly vocations, desire for better pastoral care of Spanish-speaking Catholics, re-establishment of a Catholic newspaper, appointment of a full-time youth director, and a reorganization of Catholic charities." As leader of the new Archdiocese, Quinn "fought against the death penalty, championed land reform and complained about extremism in the right-to-life movement." 

Pope Paul VI named Quinn to participate in the 1974 World Synod of Bishops.

Archbishop of San Francisco
Quinn's appointment by Pope Paul VI in 1977 was received with local praise; for almost his entire episcopate in San Francisco the archbishop enjoyed the support of priests and the lay faithful. In his early years in the Bay Area he was simultaneously president of the USCC NCCB, which often kept him away from the archdiocese. He was the first bishop of a diocese west of the Mississippi to become president of the USCC. He succeeded Joseph Bernardin (then Bishop of Cincinnati). Kenneth Briggs, writing for The New York Times, deemed Quinn to be "much more at ease with the press than his predecessor". The same article described Quinn as "a polished, courtly gentleman, self-assured with a substantial element of modesty and self-effacement."

Quinn recognized that the Archdiocese was too large for effective pastoral governance and helped devise plans for the creation of the Diocese of San Jose, which was erected by Pope John Paul II on January 27, 1981.

LGBT
Quinn reached out to gay Catholics as early as 1983. He issued a document that asked priests to take concerns of gay people seriously. In it, he said he wanted gay Catholics to find "a church where he or she will find acceptance, understanding, and love." Priests were reminded in the letter that many gay Catholics saw their orientation as a positive.

He supported the efforts of Most Holy Redeemer Church in The Castro in their efforts to reach out to the LGBT population of the neighborhood. Quinn regularly visited this parish, especially during the annual 40 Hours Vigil held throughout the 1980s in support of those who were HIV-positive and their caregivers.

AIDS
In 1985, Archbishop Quinn initiated the Catholic Church's first institutional response to the AIDS epidemic and when John Paul II visited San Francisco in 1987, Archbishop Quinn arranged for the pontiff to meet with several AIDS patients, including a young boy.

Loma Prieta earthquake
In the 1990s, Quinn turned his attention to the needs of the archdiocese after the Loma Prieta earthquake, which damaged many churches. The Archdiocese of San Francisco drew up a plan which would see the closure of a dozen parishes whose churches had been damaged in the earthquake. This plan drew the wrath of many priests, 41 of whom signed a dissenting petition. Quinn sold the former archiepiscopal residence and in the summer of 1992 moved into the cathedral rectory, where he lived with fellow clergy until his retirement.

Scandals, unusually early retirement
Quinn retired at 66, much earlier than the usual 75, after a "tumultuous 18-year reign". He had taken a leave of absence because of depression in 1987, but returned to lead the archdiocese effectively. There followed "a series of scandals during the past two years [1993-1995] involving child abuse and embezzlement by several San Francisco priests." The archbishop received particularly harsh criticism for his lenient treatment of the pedophile priest Msgr. Patrick J. O'Shea, who was later removed from ministry and laicized. O'Shea was a prominent figure in the Archdiocese of San Francisco, often promoted by Quinn. From 1972 to 1982, for instance, O'Shea was Assistant Director for Vocations, tasked with recruiting young priests, and also director of the archdiocesan Society for the Propagation of the Faith (1971-1982).

Views
Quinn became a regular contributor to the Jesuit magazine America and wrote several books.

Irenicism and liberalism
Quinn was an irenic and liberal presence in San Francisco who, in the 1970s and 1980s, offered leadership to Catholics in the United States on issues as diverse as women religious, nuclear weapons, sanctuary for Central American refugees, and working to overturn Roe vs. Wade.

Óscar Romero
After the assassination of Archbishop Óscar Romero in March 1980, Quinn issued a statement lauding the murdered prelate as "a voice for the poor and the oppressed." Quinn attended Romero's funeral.

The Reform of the Papacy 
Throughout his episcopate he maintained strong links with the Catholic Church in England; he visited there regularly. After his retirement as archbishop, he spent time at Campion Hall, Oxford, giving a talk in 1996 on "The Claims of the Primacy and the Costly Call to Unity". It was the first draft of his 1999 book, The Reform of the Papacy.

This call for the reform of the Roman Curia and a reduction of its powers was interpreted by some as an attack on the papacy.   Quinn repeatedly made it clear that he was not opposing the Vatican. In many ways, his writings prefigured the views of Pope Francis.

Selected works
 The Reform of the Papacy (New York: Crossroad Publishing, 1999). 
 Revered and Reviled: A Re-Examination of Vatican Council I (New York: Crossroad Publishing, 2017).
 Ever Ancient, Ever New: Structures of Communion in the Church (New York: Paulist Press, 2013).

See also

References

External links
 Roman Catholic Archdiocese of San Francisco Official Site

1929 births
2017 deaths
People from Riverside, California
Roman Catholic archbishops of San Francisco
Roman Catholic archbishops of Oklahoma City
Roman Catholic Diocese of San Diego
20th-century Roman Catholic archbishops in the United States
21st-century Roman Catholic archbishops in the United States
Writers from California